Canasta uruguaya ("Uruguayan Basket") is a 1951 Mexican film. It was written by Luis Alcoriza.

Cast
 Abel Salazar
 Alma Rosa Aguirre
 Jorge Reyes
 Sara Montes
 Sara Guasch
 Dolores Camarillo
 Florencio Castelló

External links
 

1951 films
1950s Spanish-language films
Mexican comedy-drama films
1951 comedy-drama films
Mexican black-and-white films
1950s Mexican films